Brave is the debut studio album by British country music duo The Shires, released in 2015. The album peaked at number ten on the UK Albums Chart, making the Shires the first ever homegrown British country act to have a top ten album in the United Kingdom.

Track listing

Personnel
Credits adapted from the liner notes of the deluxe edition of Brave.

The Shires
 Ben Earle – lead vocals, backing vocals, acoustic guitar, bass guitar, piano, mandolin, pedal steel
 Chrissie Rhodes – lead vocals, background vocals

Additional personnel

 Dan McDougall - drums, bass guitar
 Johan Fransson - background vocals
 Oliver Harrop - background vocals
 Mark Hill - bass guitar
 Jonty Howard - background vocals, percussion
 Pat O'Brien - acoustic guitar
 Troy Lancaster - electric guitar
 Tobias Lundgren - background vocals
 Steve Morton - background vocals
 Joe Murphy - percussion 
 Mike Payne - electric guitar
 Ben Poole - electric guitar
 Brian Pruitt - drums, percussion
 Davide Rossi - strings

Charts and certifications

Weekly charts

Year-end charts

Certifications

References

2015 debut albums
The Shires (duo) albums